Is It True may refer to:

Names
Is It True (horse)

Music
"Is It True" (Brenda Lee song), 1964
"Is It True?" (Yohanna song), 2009
"Is It True", a 1975 song by Barrett Strong
"Is It True", a song by The Eagles from the 1974 album On the Border
"Is It True?", a song by Maximo Park from the 2014 album Too Much Information
"Is It True", a song by Saint Etienne from the 1997 album Continental
"Is It True", a 2018 song by Target
"Is It True", a song by Tame Impala from the 2020 album The Slow Rush

See also
Is It True What They Say About Dixie? Al Jolson